A Drum tower in Europe is a round tower that has a longer diameter length than height, resembling the shape of the musical instrument. Sometimes the term is used erroneously to describe typical round Norman defense towers or circular towers in general.

References

Architectural elements
Towers